Sangil station is a railway station in Ch'ŏlsan-gu, Tŏksŏng, South Hamgyŏng, North Korea. It is on located on the Tŏksŏng line of the Korean State Railway.

References

Railway stations in North Korea